Centre-Péninsule-Saint-Sauveur is a provincial electoral district for the Legislative Assembly of New Brunswick, Canada.  It was created in the 1994 redistribution of districts as Centre-Péninsule; its boundaries were adjusted in the 2006 redistribution in order to rebalance the population of districts on the Acadian Peninsula.  Though the Electoral Boundaries Commission did not recommend a name change, the Legislative Assembly later decided to change the name by adding Saint-Sauveur to its name.

Members of the Legislative Assembly

Electoral results

Centre-Péninsule-Saint-Sauveur

Centre-Péninsule

References

External links 
Website of the Legislative Assembly of New Brunswick
Map of Centre-Péninsule-Saint-Sauveur riding (2010)

Former provincial electoral districts of New Brunswick